2C-TFM is a psychedelic phenethylamine of the 2C family.  It was first synthesized in the laboratory of David E. Nichols.  It has also been called 2C-CF3, a name derived from the Para-trifluoromethyl group it contains.

Chemistry

2C-TFM is a code that represents 4-trifluoromethyl-2,5-dimethoxyphenethylamine.  The full name of the chemical is 2-[2,5-dimethoxy-4-(trifluoromethyl)phenyl]ethanamine.

Dosage

A psychedelic dosage of 2C-TFM is reported to be 3–5 mg.

Effects

Very little data exists, but some reports suggest 2C-TFM produces psychedelic (hallucinogenic/entheogenic) effects that last between 5 and 7 hours. It is considered to be the strongest 2C variation.

Legality

United States 
2C-TFM is unscheduled and uncontrolled in the United States, but possession and sales of 2C-TFM could potentially be prosecuted under the Federal Analog Act because of its structural similarities to 2C-B and 2C-T-7. However, 2C-TFM, unlike many other phenethylamines, has not been widely sold by internet retailers. In the wake of Operation Web Tryp in July 2004, the issue of possession and sales of 2C-TFM and other similar chemicals will probably be resolved in the courtroom as well the fate of this rare but unique psychedelic. There have been no reported deaths or hospitalizations from 2C-TFM.

Canada
As of October 31st, 2016, 2C-TFM is a controlled substance (Schedule III) in Canada.

Pharmacology

The mechanism that produces the hallucinogenic and entheogenic effects of 2C-TFM is most likely to result from action as a 5-HT2A serotonin receptor agonist in the brain, a mechanism of action shared by all of the hallucinogenic tryptamines and phenethylamines. 2C-TFM displaced radiolabelled ketanserin from 5-HT2A/C receptors with a Ki of 74.5 nM, as compared to a Ki of 80.9 nM for the more well known 5-HT2A agonist DOI, indicating similar binding affinity at the receptor. The high binding affinity conferred by the 4-trifluoromethyl group is demonstrated by the fact that 2C-TFM is one of the only simple phenethylamines to rival the potency of psychedelic amphetamines like DOI and DOB, in both in vitro studies and human trials.

Dangers

The toxicity of 2C-TFM is not known.

Synthesis
It is noted in The Shulgin Index Volume 1: Psychedelic Phenethylamines and Related Compounds where the synthesis is written "from 2C-I (with trifluoroacetic anhydride) to 1-(2,5-dimethoxy-4-iodophenyl)-2-(trifluoroacetamido)ethane; (with methyl chlorodifluoroacetate, KF, Cul) to 1-(2,5-dimethoxy-4-trifluoromethylphenyl)-2-(trifluoroacetamido)ethane; (with KOH) to 2C-TFM."  The synthesis was published by Nichols and his research team. Since 2C-TFM is usually synthesised from 2C-I and the reaction does not generally consume all of the starting material, samples of 2C-TFM are likely to be contaminated with detectable traces of unreacted 2C-I, which may pose legal issues in jurisdictions where 2C-I is illegal, even though 2C-TFM itself may not be prohibited.

References

2C (psychedelics)
Trifluoromethyl compounds
Phenethylamines
Methoxy compounds